Sarıyar is a town in Nallıhan district of Ankara Province, Turkey.

Sarıyar is may also refer to the following places in Turkey:

 Sarıyar, Amasya, a village the central district of in Amasya Province
 Sarıyar, Güce, a village in Güce district of Giresun Province
 Sarıyar, Mudurnu, a village in Mudurnu district of Bolu Province
 Sarıyar Dam, near the town of Sarıyar
 Sarıyar, Şenkaya

See also 
 Sarıyer

Turkish toponyms